Conscription, sometimes called "the draft", is the compulsory enlistment of people in a national service, most often a military service. Historically, only men have been subjected to military drafts. Currently only two countries conscript women and men on the same formal conditions: Norway and Sweden. 

Some masculists and feminists and opponents of discrimination against men have criticized military conscription, or compulsory military service, as sexist. They regard it as discriminatory to compel men, but not women, into military service. They say conscription of men normalizes male violence, conscripts are indoctrinated into sexism and violence against men, and military training socializes conscripts into patriarchal gender roles. However, some feminist organizations have resisted inclusion of women in conscription, most notably the Norwegian Association for Women's Rights.

While not all feminists are anti-militarists, opposition to war and militarism has been a strong current within the women's movement. Prominent suffragists like Quaker Alice Paul, and Barbara Deming, a feminist activist and thinker of the 1960s and '70s, were ardent pacifists. Moreover, feminist critique has often regarded the military as a "hierarchical, male-dominated institution promoting destructive forms of power." Feminists have been organizers and participants in resistance to conscription.

History
Historically, men have been subjected to conscription in the most cases, and only in the late 20th century did this begin to change, though most countries still require only men to serve in the military. The integration of women into militaries, and especially into combat forces, did not begin on a large scale until late in the 20th century. In his book The Second Sexism: Discrimination Against Men and Boys (2012), philosopher David Benatar states that the theoretical arguments are immaterial to those who are pressed into service: "Some women are excluded from combat, but many more women are exempt. While some men are excluded from combat (because they fail the relevant tests), many more are pressured or forced into combat." According to Benatar, "[t]he prevailing assumption is that where conscription is necessary, it is only men who should be conscripted and, similarly, that only males should be forced into combat". This, he believes, "is a sexist assumption".

Current practice

As of now, ten countries conscript both men and women, of which Norway (since 2013) and Sweden (since 2018) conscript both sexes on the same formal conditions. Norway was also the first NATO country to introduce obligatory military service for women as an act of gender equality. Other countries conscript women into their armed forces, but with some difference in e.g. service exemptions and length of service; these countries include Israel (where women are about 40% of conscripts drafted every year), Myanmar, Eritrea, Libya, Malaysia, North Korea, Peru and Tunisia. Other countries—such as Finland, Turkey, Lithuania, Singapore, and South Korea—still use a system of conscription which requires military service from only men, although women are permitted to serve voluntarily. Most European countries have no enforced conscription for either gender. The Netherlands, where conscription is not abolished but suspended for peacetime, introduced in 2018 a law extending mandatory military service to women. Czech Republic and Bulgaria also do not have active conscription anymore, but in case of returning it back, all citizens, men and women, are eligible for military draft.

In Singapore, conscription of women have recently been a subject of debate. In 2022, Defence Minister Ng Eng Hen claimed that the societal cost will outweigh the benefits, and women will have delayed their entry in the workforce. In the same speech, he affirmed his stand that there is no need to conscript women. 

Men in Switzerland are required by law to perform military service and any man deemed unfit or exempted from service must pay 3% of their annual income as military exemption tax, at a minimum of 400CHF ($420). This gender selective draft has previously been challenged in the country, but the case was rejected by the Federal Supreme Court on the grounds that the specific law requiring service takes precedence over the general law forbidding sex discrimination. Chantal Galladé, former president of the Swiss Defence Committee calls the conscription of men a discrimination against both men and women, cementing the stereotypical gender roles of men and women.

The practice of conscription has been criticized by various men's rights groups, such as the National Coalition for Men, which claims that "no gender oppression is comparable". These groups have been joined on occasion by certain feminist activists. Beginning in the 1970s, "liberal feminists" have argued in favor of extending conscription to women, taking the position that women cannot have the same rights as men if they do not have the same responsibilities, and that exempting women from conscription perpetuates stereotypes of women as weak and helpless. Radical and pacifist feminists have disagreed, however, contending that "by integrating into existing power structures including military forces and the war system without changing them, women merely prop up a male-dominated world instead of transforming it". There were disagreements between liberal advocates for women's equality and radical and pacifist feminists both in 1980 and again in 2016 on whether women should be included in draft registration or draft registration should be opposed for women and men.

Anthropologist Ayse Gül Altinay has commented that "given equal suffrage rights, there is no other citizenship practice that differentiates as radically between men and women as compulsory male conscription" and continues elsewhere, stating that "any attempt to de-gender nationalism and citizenship needs to incorporate a discussion of universal male conscription". She goes on to quote feminist writer Cynthia Enloe, who argues that "there is a reason that so many states in the world have implemented military conscription laws for young men: most of those men would not join the state's military if it were left up to them to choose".

Selective service

In the United States, most male US citizens and residents must register with the Selective Service System within 30 days of their 18th birthday. Those who fail to register may be punished by up to five years in prison and a fine of up to $250,000, although no non-registrants have been prosecuted since January 1986. They may also be ineligible for federal student financial aid, federal job training and federal employment, and for certain states, state employment and even driver's licenses. As of 2014, transgender women are required to register for selective service, but may file for an exemption in the event they are drafted. Transgender men are not required to register but may face difficulties in receiving benefits which require registration. Currently, women are exempted from the Selective Service System as only males are required to register; this cannot be changed without Congress amending the law, although combat roles for women have been allowed since January 23, 2013, which certain political analysts have said may get rid of the female exemption of registration.

Legal issues
The selective service had been previously challenged in court in Rostker v. Goldberg in 1981, Elgin v. Department of Treasury in 2012, and in National Coalition for Men v. Selective Service System in 2019. All have argued in small or large part on the grounds of equal protection and due process on the basis of gender. 
Professor Stephanie M. Wildman of Santa Clara Law called the decision to uphold the constitutionality of male conscription in Rostker v. Goldberg "chilling to any advocate of full societal participation". In the ensuing congressional debate, Senator Mark Hatfield argued that:

On February 22, 2019, Judge Grey H. Miller of the U.S. District Court for the Southern District of Texas, deciding on National Coalition for Men v. Selective Service System, declared the current male-only Selective Service registration requirement unconstitutional. That ruling was reversed by the Fifth Circuit. In June 2021, the U.S. Supreme Court declined to review the decision by the Court of Appeals.

References

Chauvinism
Sexism
Gender equality
Conscription
Women in the military